Avant is the French word for 'fore' and 'ahead of'.

Avant can refer to:

People
 Avant, part of music production team Bloodshy & Avant
 Avant (singer), Myron Avant, an American singer
 Clarence Avant, a music executive
 Jason Avant, is a US American football player

Places
 Avant, Oklahoma, United States
 The Avant, a high-rise in Buffalo, New York, United States

Technology

Computing
 Avant Browser
 Avant Window Navigator, computer software
 Avanti Corporation, whose name is often written “Avant!”

Transport
Avant (train), a medium distance high speed rail service in Spain
Avant (airline), a former airline that operated flights within Chile in the late 1990s
Audi Avant, a station wagon
Audi RS2 Avant, a high performance estate car
Citroën Traction Avant, a 1930s saloon car

Music
 Avant-pop
 Avant-punk
 Avant-prog
 Avant-rock
 Avant Hard, an album by Add N to (X)
 Avant Records, a former Japanese record label founded by John Zorn

Other
 Avant (company), an online personal loan lender located in downtown Chicago
 Avant (journal), an academic interdisciplinary studies and philosophy of science journal
 AVANT, an American art collective

See also
 Avant-garde (disambiguation)
 Avante (disambiguation)